Meade Layne (September 8, 1882May 12, 1961) was an American academic and early researcher of ufology and parapsychology, best known for proposing an early version of the interdimensional hypothesis to explain flying saucer sightings.

Early life 
Layne was born in Viroqua, Wisconsin and raised in San Diego. Layne sold office supplies, worked as a real estate agent, managed an oil and gas company, and wrote poetry. He claimed to have earned a PhD in English literature.

Career 
Layne was the founder and first director of Borderland Sciences Research Associates. Prior to his public work studying ufos, Layne was professor at the University of Southern California, and English department head at Illinois Wesleyan University and Florida Southern College.

"Etheria"

Layne speculated that, rather than representing advanced military or extraterrestrial technology, flying saucers were piloted by beings from a parallel dimension, which he called Etheria, and their "ether ships" were usually invisible but could be seen when their atomic motion became slow enough. He further claimed that Etherians could become stranded on the terrestrial plane when their ether ships malfunctioned, and that various governments were aware of these incidents and had investigated them.

Furthermore, Layne argued that Etherians and their ether ships inspired much of earth's mythology and religion, but that they were truly mortal beings despite having a high level of technological and spiritual advancement. He claimed that their motive in coming to the terrestrial plane of existence was to reveal their accumulated wisdom to humanity. These revelations would be relayed through individuals with sufficiently developed psychic abilities, allowing them to contact the Etherians and communicate with them directly; in particular, he relied extensively on the mediumship of Mark Probert as confirmation of his theories.

Death 
Layne died in San Diego in 1961.

See also
 Jacques Vallée

Bibliography
 Layne, Meade, The Ether Ship Mystery And Its Solution, San Diego, Calif., 1950.
 Layne, Meade, The Coming of The Guardians, San Diego, Calif., 1954.

Footnotes

References
 

1882 births
1961 deaths
Parapsychologists
Ufologists